The Labour Representation Committee was a reformist labour organization in Manitoba, Canada, and was the ideological successor to groups such as the Winnipeg Labour Party, the Independent Labour Party and the Manitoba Labour Party.  It was founded in late 1912, and was based on a British organization of the same name.

The LRC cooperated with the Social Democratic Party of Canada in the municipal elections of 1913, and the two parties did not compete against each other in the 1914 provincial election.  This was a marked contrast to the hostility which had previously existed between reformist labour groups and the Socialist Party of Canada (from which the SDPC had split).

The party's candidates in 1914 were W.J. Bartlett (Assiniboia) and R.S. Ward (Elmwood). All of these candidates placed third, behind their Conservative and Liberal opponents. Fred Dixon was not a candidate of the LRC in 1914, but sympathized with most of its goals and was from the same reformist tradition.  Unofficially supported by many in the LRC, Dixon was elected as an independent candidate in a Winnipeg constituency.

For the provincial election of 1915, the LRC supported the two SDPC candidates in Winnipeg North (one of whom was successful), and also nominated William Bayley in Assiniboia.  Bayley finished ahead of John Thomas Haig, the riding's Tory incumbent, and came within 55 votes of defeating Liberal John Wilton.  Dixon again ran as an independent.

The candidates nominated by the LRC in 1914-15 officially ran as "Independent Labour".

This organization dissolved after the election of 1915.  Three years later, some of its supporters (including Dixon and Arthur Puttee) started the Dominion Labour Party in Winnipeg.

Provincial political parties in Manitoba
Socialist parties in Canada
Defunct political parties in Canada
1912 establishments in Manitoba